Vitorino is a Portuguese surname and given name. Notable people with the name include:

Given name
Vitorino (born 1942), mononymous name of Portuguese singer-songwriter Vitorino Salomé Vieira
Vitorino Antunes (born 1987), Portuguese footballer
Vitorino de Brito Freire (1908–1977), Brazilian politician
Vitorino Hilton (born 1977), Brazilian footballer
Vitorino Magalhães Godinho (1918–2011), Portuguese historian
Vitorino Nemésio (1901–1978), Portuguese author and poet
Vitorino Silva (born 1971), Portuguese television personality and politician

Surname
Ana Paula Vitorino (born 1962), Portuguese politician
António Vitorino (born 1957), Portuguese politician
Leonardo Vitorino (born 1973), Brazilian footballer
Manuel Vitorino (1853–1902), Brazilian politician

Portuguese-language surnames
Portuguese masculine given names